Star Wars is an American epic space opera multimedia franchise created by George Lucas, which began with the eponymous 1977 film and quickly became a worldwide pop culture phenomenon. The franchise has been expanded into various films and other media, including television series, video games, novels, comic books, theme park attractions, and themed areas, comprising an all-encompassing fictional universe. Star Wars is one of the highest-grossing media franchises of all time.

The original film (Star Wars), retroactively subtitled Episode IV: A New Hope (1977), was followed by the sequels Episode V: The Empire Strikes Back (1980) and Episode VI: Return of the Jedi (1983), forming the original Star Wars trilogy. Lucas later returned to the series to direct a prequel trilogy, consisting of Episode I: The Phantom Menace (1999), Episode II: Attack of the Clones (2002), and Episode III: Revenge of the Sith (2005). In 2012, Lucas sold his production company to Disney, relinquishing his ownership of the franchise. This led to a sequel trilogy, consisting of Episode VII: The Force Awakens (2015), Episode VIII: The Last Jedi (2017), and Episode IX: The Rise of Skywalker (2019).

All nine films of the "Skywalker Saga" were nominated for Academy Awards, with wins going to the first two releases. Together with the theatrical live action "anthology" films Rogue One (2016) and Solo (2018), the combined box office revenue of the films equated to over  billion, which makes it the second-highest-grossing film franchise of all time. Additional upcoming films are in the works, including an untitled movie from Taika Waititi and Rogue Squadron directed by Patty Jenkins, both currently without release dates.

Premise 
The Star Wars franchise depicts the adventures of characters "A long time ago in a galaxy far, far away", in which humans and many species of aliens (often humanoid) co-exist with robots (typically referred to in the films as 'droids'), who may assist them in their daily routines; space travel between planets is common due to lightspeed hyperspace technology. The planets range from wealthy, planet-wide cities to deserts scarcely populated by primitive tribes. Virtually any Earth biome, along with many fictional ones, has its counterpart as a Star Wars planet which, in most cases, teem with sentient and non-sentient alien life. The franchise also makes use of other astronomical objects such as asteroid fields and nebulae. Spacecraft range from small starfighters, to huge capital ships such as the Star Destroyers, to space stations such as the moon-sized Death Stars. Telecommunication includes two-way audio and audiovisual screens, holographic projections, and HoloNet (internet counterpart).

The universe of Star Wars is generally similar to ours but its laws of physics are less strict allowing for more imaginative stories. One result of that is a mystical power known as the Force which is described in the original film as "an energy field created by all living things ... [that] binds the galaxy together". The field is depicted as a kind of pantheistic god. Through training and meditation, those whom "the Force is strong with" exhibit various superpowers (such as telekinesis, precognition, telepathy, and manipulation of physical energy). It is believed nothing is impossible for the Force. The mentioned powers are wielded by two major knightly orders at conflict with each other: the Jedi, peacekeepers of the Galactic Republic who act on the light side of the Force through non-attachment and arbitration, and the Sith, who use the dark side by manipulating fear and aggression. While Jedi Knights can be numerous, the Dark Lords of the Sith (or 'Darths') are intended to be limited to two: a master and their apprentice. Another notable fictional element of Star Wars is hyperspace, an alternate dimension that allows faster-than-light travel.

Force-wielders are very limited in numbers in comparison to the population. The Jedi and Sith prefer the use of a weapon called a lightsaber, a blade of plasma that can cut through virtually any surface and deflect energy bolts. The rest of the population, as well as renegades and soldiers, use plasma-powered blaster firearms. As a result of galaxy-scaled politics (involving republics, empires, kingdoms, alliances, etc.), all this weaponry is made use of in various military conflicts during which most Star Wars material takes place. In the outer reaches of the galaxy, crime syndicates such as the Hutt cartel are dominant. Bounty hunters are often employed by both gangsters and governments. Illicit activities include smuggling and slavery.

The combination of science fiction and fantasy elements makes Star Wars a very universal franchise, capable of telling stories of various genres.

Films

The Skywalker Saga

Spin-off films

Upcoming films 

The Star Wars film series centers around three sets of trilogies, the nine films of which are collectively referred to as the "Skywalker Saga". They were produced non-chronologically, with Episodes IV–VI (the original trilogy) being released between 1977 and 1983, Episodes I–III (the prequel trilogy) being released between 1999 and 2005, and Episodes VII–IX (the sequel trilogy), being released between 2015 and 2019. Each trilogy focuses on a generation of the Force-sensitive Skywalker family. The original trilogy depicts the heroic development of Luke Skywalker, the prequels tell the backstory of his father Anakin, while the sequels feature Luke's nephew, Ben Solo, and Luke's protegé Rey.

An anthology series set between the main episodes entered development in parallel to the production of the sequel trilogy, described by Disney chief financial officer Jay Rasulo as origin stories. The first entry, Rogue One (2016), tells the story of the rebels who steal the Death Star plans just before Episode IV. Solo (2018) focuses on Han Solo's backstory, also featuring original trilogy co-protagonists Chewbacca and Lando Calrissian and involving prequel trilogy villain Darth Maul.

Lucasfilm has a number of Star Wars films in development, two of which were confirmed during Disney Investor Day 2020. The first will be an unspecified film from Taika Waititi, who in May 2020 was announced to be directing a Star Wars film he was co-writing with Krysty Wilson-Cairns. The second is a film titled Rogue Squadron, which is being directed by Patty Jenkins. Additionally, a trilogy independent from the Skywalker Saga is being written by The Last Jedi writer/director Rian Johnson. In September 2019, it was announced that Kathleen Kennedy and Kevin Feige would collaborate to develop a Star Wars film; however, the film was no longer in active development as of May 2022. In February 2020, a film was announced to be in development from director J. D. Dillard and writer Matt Owens; however, Dillard announced he was no longer to direct that film in November 2022. In May 2022, the Waititi film was expected to be the next Star Wars film to be produced, ahead of the previously announced Rogue Squadron, with Kennedy stating that they were aiming for a late 2023 release date but had not yet officially scheduled one. As of September 2022, untitled films are scheduled for release on December 19, 2025, December 17, 2027 and December 21, 2029.

History

Original trilogy 

In 1971, George Lucas wanted to film an adaptation of the Flash Gordon serial, but could not obtain the rights, so he began developing his own space opera. After directing American Graffiti (1973), he wrote a two-page synopsis, which 20th Century Fox decided to invest in. By 1974, he had expanded the story into the first draft of a screenplay.
Fox expected the film would be of limited financial success, and so it was given a relatively low budget, with production being moved to Elstree Studios in England to help save on cost. Many of the scenes were shot in England, and so featured a number of British actors. The Star Wars robots were built by the small English company Peteric Engineering. A 2019 BBC documentary revealed how the parts required to create these machines and other now iconic film props, including the light sabers (originally called 'laser guns'), were ingeniously recycled from items scavenged in junk shops, ever conscious of the need to spend as little money as possible.
The 1977 movie's success led Lucas to make it the basis of an elaborate film serial. With the backstory he created for the sequel, Lucas decided that the series would be a trilogy of trilogies. Most of the main cast would return for the two additional installments of the original trilogy, which were self-financed by Lucasfilm.

Star Wars was released on May 25, 1977, and first subtitled Episode IV: A New Hope in the 1979 book The Art of Star Wars. Episode V: The Empire Strikes Back was released on May 21, 1980, also achieving wide financial and critical success. The final film in the trilogy, Episode VI: Return of the Jedi was released on May 25, 1983. The story of the original trilogy focuses on Luke Skywalker's quest to become a Jedi, his struggle with the evil Imperial agent Darth Vader, and the struggle of the Rebel Alliance to free the galaxy from the clutches of the Galactic Empire.

Prequel trilogy 

According to producer Gary Kurtz, loose plans for a prequel trilogy were developed during the outlining of the original two films. In 1980, Lucas confirmed that he had the nine-film series plotted, but due to the stress of producing the original trilogy, he had decided to cancel further sequels by 1981. In 1983, Lucas explained that "There was never a script completed that had the entire story as it exists now ... As the stories unfolded, I would take certain ideas and save them ... I kept taking out all the good parts, and I just kept telling myself I would make other movies someday."

Technical advances in the late 1980s and early 1990s, including the ability to create computer-generated imagery (CGI), inspired Lucas to consider that it might be possible to revisit his saga. In 1989, Lucas stated that the prequels would be "unbelievably expensive". In 1992, he acknowledged that he had plans to create the prequel trilogy. A theatrical rerelease of the original trilogy in 1997 "updated" the 20-year-old films with the style of CGI envisioned for the new trilogy.

Episode I: The Phantom Menace was released on May 19, 1999, and Episode II: Attack of the Clones on May 16, 2002. Episode III: Revenge of the Sith, the first  film in the franchise, was released on May 19, 2005. The first two movies were met with mixed reviews, with the third being received somewhat more positively. The trilogy begins 32 years before Episode IV and follows the Jedi training of Anakin Skywalker, Luke's father, and his eventual fall from grace and transformation into the Sith lord Darth Vader, as well as the corruption of the Galactic Republic and rise of the Empire led by Darth Sidious. Together with the original trilogy, Lucas has collectively referred to the first six episodic films of the franchise as "the tragedy of Darth Vader".

Sequel trilogy 

Prior to releasing the original film, and made possible by its success, Lucas planned "three trilogies of nine films". However, he announced to Time in 1978 that he planned "10 sequels". He confirmed that he had outlined the prequels and sequels in 1981. At various stages of development, the sequel trilogy was to focus on the rebuilding of the Republic, the return of Luke in a role similar to that of Obi-Wan Kenobi in the original trilogy, Luke's sister (not yet determined to be Leia), Han, Leia, R2-D2 and C-3PO. However, after beginning work on the prequel trilogy, Lucas insisted that Star Wars was meant to be a six-part series and that there would be no sequel trilogy.

Lucas decided to leave the franchise in the hands of other filmmakers, announcing in January 2012 that he would make no more Star Wars films. That October, the Walt Disney Company agreed to buy Lucasfilm and announced that Episode VII would be released in 2015. The co-chairman of Lucasfilm, Kathleen Kennedy, became president and served as executive producer of new Star Wars feature films. Lucas provided Kennedy his story treatments for the sequels during the 2012 sale, but in 2015 it was revealed Lucas's sequel outline had been discarded. The sequel trilogy also meant the end of the existing Star Wars Expanded Universe, which was discarded from canon to give "maximum creative freedom to the filmmakers and also preserve an element of surprise and discovery for the audience."

Episode VII: The Force Awakens was released on December 16, 2015, Episode VIII: The Last Jedi on December 13, 2017, and Episode IX: The Rise of Skywalker on December 18, 2019, in many countries. The Force Awakens and The Last Jedi were both critical and box office successes. Episode IX received a mixed reception from critics and audiences. The sequel trilogy starts 30 years after Episode VI and focuses on the journey of the Force-sensitive orphan Rey, guided by Luke Skywalker. Along with ex-stormtrooper Finn and ace X-Wing pilot Poe Dameron, Rey helps the Resistance, led by Leia, fight the First Order, commanded by Han and Leia's son (and Luke's nephew), Kylo Ren.

Anthology films 

Lucasfilm and Kennedy have stated that the standalone films would be referred to as the Star Wars anthology series (though the word anthology has not been used in any of the titles, instead carrying the promotional "A Star Wars Story" subtitle). Focused on how the Rebels obtained the Death Star plans introduced in the 1977 film, the first anthology film, Rogue One: A Star Wars Story, was released on December 16, 2016, to favorable reviews and box office success. The second, Solo: A Star Wars Story, centered on a young Han Solo with Chewbacca and Lando as supporting characters, was released on May 25, 2018, to generally favorable reviews and underperformance at the box office. The television series Obi-Wan Kenobi was originally going to be a film instead but changed to a limited series due to Solo underperforming. Despite this, more anthology films are expected to be released, following a hiatus after 2019's The Rise of Skywalker.

Television 
The Star Wars franchise has been spun off to various television productions, including two animated series released in the mid-1980s. Further animated series began to be released in the 2000s, the first two of which focused on the Clone Wars. After Disney's acquisition of Lucasfilm, only the later CGI series remained canon. Eight live-action Star Wars series will be released on Disney+. The first, The Mandalorian, premiered on November 12, 2019, and won the 2020 Webby Award for Television & Film in the category Social. Disney+ later released the Ewoks movies and animated series, along with the animated first appearance of Boba Fett from the Star Wars Holiday Special, and the Clone Wars animated micro-series in a section called "Star Wars Vintage", which also includes the Droids animated series. Certain aspects of the original Clone Wars micro-series are considered to not contradict the canon, while others do.

Series 

Many Star Wars series have been produced, both animated and live-action, the first being Droids and Ewoks in 1985. The Mandalorian, the first live-action series to take place in the Star Wars universe, has spawned multiple spinoffs and inspired other live-action series to be created. Confirmed upcoming animated series include Young Jedi Adventures, as well as upcoming live-action series Ahsoka, Skeleton Crew, The Acolyte, and Lando.

Films and specials

Fictional timeline 

The Star Wars canon fictional universe spans multiple eras, of which three are focused around each of the film trilogies. The following eras were defined in January 2021:

 The High Republic: The era of the "High Republic", set 200 years before the prequel trilogy. It includes the media released in The High Republic and the upcoming Young Jedi Adventures and The Acolyte.
 Fall of the Jedi: The era of the prequel trilogy, in which the democratic Galactic Republic is corrupted by the Supreme Chancellor Palpatine, who is secretly the Sith Lord Darth Sidious. After orchestrating the Clone Wars between the Republic and a Separatist confederation, Palpatine exterminates the Jedi Order, overthrows the Republic, and establishes the totalitarian Galactic Empire. It includes the prequel trilogy films and the animated The Clone Wars and Tales of the Jedi.
 Reign of the Empire: The era after the prequel trilogy, exploring the reign of the Empire. It includes the animated The Bad Batch, Solo: A Star Wars Story and Obi-Wan Kenobi.
 Age of Rebellion: The era of the original trilogy, in which the Empire is fought by the Rebel Alliance in a Galactic Civil War that spans several years, climaxing with the death of the Emperor and fall of the Empire. It includes the animated Star Wars Rebels, Andor, Rogue One: A Star Wars Story, and the original trilogy films.
 The New Republic: The era after the original trilogy, set during the formative years of the New Republic following the fall of the Empire. It includes The Mandalorian and its spin-off series, The Book of Boba Fett and Ahsoka, as well as the upcoming Skeleton Crew.
 Rise of the First Order: The era of the sequel trilogy, in which the remnants of the Empire have reformed as the First Order. Heroes of the former Rebellion, aided by the New Republic, lead the Resistance against the oppressive regime and its rulers—the mysterious being known as Snoke and the revived Palpatine. It includes the animated Star Wars Resistance and the sequel trilogy films.

The Expanded Universe of spin-off media depicts different levels of continuity, which were deemed non-canonical and rebranded as Legends on April 25, 2014, to make most subsequent works align to the episodic films, The Clone Wars film, and television series.

Other media 

From 1976 to 2014, the term Expanded Universe (EU) was an umbrella term for all officially licensed Star Wars storytelling material set outside the events depicted within the theatrical films, including novels, comics, and video games. Lucasfilm maintained internal continuity between the films and television content and the EU material until April 25, 2014, when the company announced all of the EU works would cease production. Existing works would no longer be considered canon to the franchise and subsequent reprints would be rebranded under the Star Wars Legends label, with downloadable content for the massively multiplayer online game The Old Republic the only Legends material to still be produced. The Star Wars canon was subsequently restructured to only include the existing six feature films, the animated film The Clone Wars (2008), and its companion animated series. All future projects and creative developments across all types of media would be overseen and coordinated by the story group, announced as a division of Lucasfilm created to maintain continuity and a cohesive vision on the storytelling of the franchise. Multiple comics series from Marvel and novels published by Del Rey were produced after the announcement.

Print media 
Star Wars in print predates the release of the first film, with the November 1976 novelization of Star Wars, initially subtitled "From the Adventures of Luke Skywalker". Credited to Lucas, it was ghostwritten by Alan Dean Foster. The first "Expanded Universe" story appeared in Marvel Comics' Star Wars #7 in January 1978 (the first six issues being an adaptation of the film), followed by Foster's sequel novel Splinter of the Mind's Eye the following month.

Novels 

After penning the novelization of the original film, Foster followed it with the sequel Splinter of the Mind's Eye (1978). The novelizations of The Empire Strikes Back (1980) by Donald F. Glut and Return of the Jedi (1983) by James Kahn followed, as well as The Han Solo Adventures trilogy (1979–1980) by Brian Daley, and The Adventures of Lando Calrissian trilogy (1983) by L. Neil Smith.

Timothy Zahn's bestselling Thrawn trilogy (1991–1993) reignited interest in the franchise and introduced the popular characters Grand Admiral Thrawn, Mara Jade, Talon Karrde, and Gilad Pellaeon. The first novel, Heir to the Empire, reached #1 on the New York Times Best Seller list, and the series finds Luke, Leia, and Han facing off against tactical genius Thrawn, who is plotting to retake the galaxy for the Empire. In The Courtship of Princess Leia (1994) by Dave Wolverton, set immediately before the Thrawn trilogy, Leia considers an advantageous political marriage to Prince Isolder of the planet Hapes,  but she and Han ultimately marry. Steve Perry's Shadows of the Empire (1996), set between The Empire Strikes Back and Return of the Jedi, was part of a multimedia campaign that included a comic book series and video game. The novel introduced the crime lord Prince Xizor, another popular character who would appear in multiple other works. Other notable series from Bantam include the Jedi Academy trilogy (1994) by Kevin J. Anderson, the 14-book Young Jedi Knights series (1995–1998) by Anderson and Rebecca Moesta, and the X-wing series (1996–2012) by Michael A. Stackpole and Aaron Allston.

Del Rey took over Star Wars book publishing in 1999, releasing what would become a 19-installment novel series called The New Jedi Order (1999–2003). Written by multiple authors, the series was set 25 to 30 years after the original films and introduced the Yuuzhan Vong, a powerful alien race attempting to invade and conquer the entire galaxy. The bestselling multi-author series Legacy of the Force (2006–2008) chronicles the crossover of Han and Leia's son Jacen Solo to the dark side of the Force; among his evil deeds, he kills Luke's wife Mara Jade as a sacrifice to join the Sith. Although no longer canon, the story is paralleled in The Force Awakens with Han and Leia's son Ben Solo, who becomes the evil Kylo Ren.

Three series set in the prequel era were published by Scholastic for younger audiences: the 18-book Jedi Apprentice (1999–2002) chronicles the adventures of Obi-Wan Kenobi and his master Qui-Gon Jinn in the years before The Phantom Menace; the 11-book Jedi Quest (2001–2004) follows Obi-Wan and his own apprentice, Anakin Skywalker in between The Phantom Menace and Attack of the Clones; and the 10-book The Last of the Jedi (2005–2008), set almost immediately after Revenge of the Sith, features Obi-Wan and the last few surviving Jedi. In 2019, a new prequel era novel, starring Qui-Gon and the young Obi-Wan, was published by Del Rey under the title Star Wars: Master and Apprentice.

Although Thrawn had been designated a Legends character in 2014, he was reintroduced into the canon in 2016 for the third season of the Rebels animated series, with Zahn returning to write more novels based on the character and set in the new canon.

Comics 

Marvel Comics published a Star Wars comic book series from 1977 to 1986. Original Star Wars comics were serialized in the Marvel magazine Pizzazz between 1977 and 1979. The 1977 installments were the first original Star Wars stories not directly adapted from the films to appear in print form, as they preceded those of the Star Wars comic series. From 1985 to 1987, the animated children's series Ewoks and Droids inspired comic series from Marvel's Star Comics line. According to Marvel comics former Editor-In-Chief Jim Shooter, the strong sales of Star Wars comics saved Marvel financially in 1977 and 1978. Marvel's Star Wars series was one of the industry's top selling titles in 1979 and 1980. The only downside for Marvel was that the 100,000 copy sales quota was surpassed quickly, allowing Lippincott to renegotiate the royalty arrangements from a position of strength.

In the late 1980s, Marvel dropped a new Star Wars comic it had in development, which was picked up by Dark Horse Comics and published as the popular Dark Empire series (1991–1995). Dark Horse subsequently launched dozens of series set after the original film trilogy, including Tales of the Jedi (1993–1998), X-wing Rogue Squadron (1995–1998), Star Wars: Republic (1998–2006), Star Wars Tales (1999–2005), Star Wars: Empire (2002–2006), and Knights of the Old Republic (2006–2010).

After Disney's acquisition of Lucasfilm, it was announced in January 2014 that in 2015 the Star Wars comics license would return to Marvel Comics, whose parent company, Marvel Entertainment, Disney had purchased in 2009. Launched in 2015, the first three publications were titled Star Wars, Darth Vader, and the limited series Princess Leia.

First announced as Project Luminous at Star Wars Celebration in April 2019, the Star Wars: The High Republic publishing initiative were revealed in a press conference in February 2020. Involving the majority of the then current officially licensed publishers, a new era set 200 years before the Skywalker Saga was explored in various books and comics. Including ongoing titles by Marvel and IDW Publishing, written by Cavan Scott and Daniel José Older respectively.

Audio

Soundtracks and singles 

John Williams composed the soundtracks for the nine episodic films; he has stated that he will retire from the franchise with The Rise of Skywalker. He also composed Han Solo's theme for Solo: A Star Wars Story; John Powell adapted and composed the rest of the score. Michael Giacchino composed the score of Rogue One. Ludwig Göransson scored and composed the music of The Mandalorian. Williams also created the main theme for Galaxy's Edge.

Audio novels 

The first Star Wars audio work is The Story of Star Wars, an LP using audio samples from the original film and a new narration to retell the story, released in 1977. Most later printed novels were adapted into audio novels, usually released on cassette tape and re-released on CD. As of 2019, audio-only novels have been released not directly based on printed media.

Radio 

Radio adaptations of the films were also produced. The production used John Williams's original film score, along with Ben Burtt's sound effects.

The first was written by science-fiction author Brian Daley and directed by John Madden. It was broadcast on National Public Radio in 1981, adapting the original 1977 film into 13 episodes. Mark Hamill and Anthony Daniels reprised their film roles.

The overwhelming success, led to a 10-episode adaptation of The Empire Strikes Back debuted in 1983. Billy Dee Williams joined the other two stars, reprising his role as Lando Calrissian.

In 1983, Buena Vista Records released an original, 30-minute Star Wars audio drama titled Rebel Mission to Ord Mantell, written by Daley. In the 1990s, Time Warner Audio Publishing adapted several Star Wars series from Dark Horse Comics into audio dramas: the three-part Dark Empire saga, Tales of the Jedi, Dark Lords of the Sith, the Dark Forces trilogy, and Crimson Empire (1998). Return of the Jedi was adapted into 6-episodes in 1996, featuring Daniels.

Video games 

The Star Wars franchise has spawned over one hundred computer, video, and board games, dating back to some of the earliest home consoles. Some are based directly on the movie material, while others rely heavily on the non-canonical Expanded Universe (rebranded as Star Wars Legends and removed from the canon in 2014). Star Wars games have gone through three significant development eras, marked by a change in leadership among the developers: the early licensed games, those developed after the creation of LucasArts, and those created after the closure of the Lucasfilm division by Disney and the transfer of the license to Electronic Arts.

Early licensed games (1979–1993) 
The first officially licensed electronic Star Wars game was Kenner's 1979 table-top Star Wars Electronic Battle Command. In 1982, Parker Brothers published the first Star Wars video game for the Atari 2600, Star Wars: The Empire Strikes Back, followed soon the year later by Star Wars: Jedi Arena, the first video game to depict lightsaber combat. They were followed in 1983 by Atari's rail shooter arcade game Star Wars, with vector graphics to replicate the Death Star trench run scene from the 1977 film. The next game, Star Wars: Return of the Jedi (1984), has more traditional raster graphics, while the following Star Wars: The Empire Strikes Back (1985) has vector graphics.

Platform games were made for the Nintendo Entertainment System, including the Japan-exclusive Star Wars (1987), an international Star Wars (1991), and Star Wars: The Empire Strikes Back (1992). Super Star Wars (1992) was released for the Super Nintendo Entertainment System, with two sequels over the next two years.

LucasArts and modern self-published games (1993–2014) 

Lucasfilm founded its own video game company in 1982, becoming best known for adventure games and World War II flight combat games, but as George Lucas took more interest in the increasing success of the video game market, he wanted to have more creative control over the games and founded his own development company, LucasArts. Improved graphics allowed games to tell complex narratives, which allowed for the retelling of the films, and eventually original narratives set in the same continuity, with voice-overs and CGI cutscenes. In 1993, LucasArts released Star Wars: X-Wing, the first self-published Star Wars video game and the first space flight simulator based on the franchise. It was one of the bestselling video games of 1993 and established its own series of games. The Rogue Squadron series was released between 1998 and 2003, also focusing on space battles set during the films.

Dark Forces (1995), a hybrid adventure game incorporating puzzles and strategy, was the first Star Wars first-person shooter. It featured gameplay and graphical features not then common in other games, made possible by LucasArts' custom-designed game engine, the Jedi. The game was well received, and it was followed by four sequels. The series introduced Kyle Katarn, who would appear in multiple games, novels, and comics. Katarn is a former stormtrooper who joins the Rebellion and becomes a Jedi, a plot arc similar to that of Finn in the sequel trilogy films. A massively multiplayer online role-playing game, Star Wars Galaxies, was in operation from 2003 until 2011. After Disney bought Lucasfilm, LucasArts ceased its role as a developer in 2013, although it still operates as a licensor.

EA Star Wars (2014–present) 
Following its acquisition of the franchise, Disney reassigned video game rights to Electronic Arts. Games made during this era are considered canonical, and feature more influence from the Star Wars filmmakers. Disney partnered with Lenovo to create the augmented reality video game Jedi Challenges, released in November 2017. In August 2018, it was announced that Zynga would publish free-to-play Star Wars mobile games. The Battlefront games received a canonical reboot with Star Wars: Battlefront in November 2015, which was followed by a sequel, Battlefront II, in November 2017. A single-player action-adventure game, Star Wars Jedi: Fallen Order, with an original story and cast of characters, was released in November 2019. A space combat game titled Star Wars: Squadrons, which builds upon the space battles from Battlefront, was released in October 2020.

Theme park attractions 

In addition to the Disneyland ride Star Tours (1987) and its successor, Star Tours: The Adventures Continue (2011), many live attractions have been held at Disney parks, including the traveling exhibition Where Science Meets Imagination, the Space Mountain spin-off Hyperspace Mountain, a walkthrough Launch Bay, and the night-time A Galactic Spectacular. An immersive themed area called Galaxy's Edge (2019) opened at Disneyland and opened at Walt Disney World in mid-2019. A themed hotel, Star Wars: Galactic Starcruiser, is currently under construction at Walt Disney World.

Multimedia projects 
A multimedia project involves works released across multiple types of media. Shadows of the Empire (1996) was a multimedia project set between The Empire Strikes Back and Return of the Jedi that included a novel by Steve Perry, a comic book series, a video game, and action figures. The Force Unleashed (2008–2010) was a similar project set between Revenge of the Sith and A New Hope that included a novel, a 2008 video game and its 2010 sequel, a graphic novel, a role-playing game supplement, and toys.

Merchandising 

The success of the Star Wars films led the franchise to become one of the most merchandised franchises in the world. While filming the original 1977 film, George Lucas decided to take a $500,000 pay cut to his salary as director in exchange for full ownership of the franchise's merchandising rights. By 1987, the first three films have made billion in merchandising revenue. By 2012, the first six films produced approximately billion in merchandising revenue.

Kenner made the first Star Wars action figures to coincide with the release of the original film, and today the original figures are highly valuable. Since the 1990s, Hasbro holds the rights to create action figures based on the saga. Pez dispensers began to be produced in 1997. Star Wars was the first intellectual property to be licensed in Lego history. Lego has produced animated parody short films and mini-series to promote their Star Wars sets. The Lego Star Wars video games are critically acclaimed bestsellers.

In 1977, the board game Star Wars: Escape from the Death Star was released. A Star Wars Monopoly and themed versions of Trivial Pursuit and Battleship were released in 1997, with updated versions released in subsequent years. The board game Risk has been adapted in two editions by Hasbro: The Clone Wars Edition (2005) and the Original Trilogy Edition (2006). Three Star Wars tabletop role-playing games have been developed: a version by West End Games in the 1980s and 1990s, one by Wizards of the Coast in the 2000s, and one by Fantasy Flight Games in the 2010s.

Star Wars Trading Cards have been published since the first "blue" series, by Topps, in 1977. Dozens of series have been produced, with Topps being the licensed creator in the United States. Each card series are of film stills or original art. Many of the cards have become highly collectible with some very rare "promos", such as the 1993 Galaxy Series II "floating Yoda" P3 card often commanding US$1,000 or more. While most "base" or "common card" sets are plentiful, many "insert" or "chase cards" are very rare. From 1995 until 2001, Decipher, Inc. had the license for, created, and produced the Star Wars Customizable Card Game.

Themes 

Star Wars features elements such as knighthood, chivalry, and Jungian archetypes such as "the shadow".
There are also many references to Christianity, such as in the appearance of Darth Maul, whose design draws heavily from traditional depictions of the devil. Anakin was conceived of a virgin birth, and is assumed to be the "Chosen One", a messianic individual. However, unlike Jesus, Anakin falls from grace, remaining evil as Darth Vader until Return of the Jedi. According to Adam Driver, sequel trilogy villain Kylo Ren, who idolizes Vader, believes he is "doing what he thinks is right". George Lucas has said that the theme of the saga is redemption.

The saga draws heavily from the hero's journey, an archetypical template developed by comparative mythologist Joseph Campbell. Each character—primarily Anakin, Luke, and Rey—follows the steps of the cycle or undergoes its reversal, becoming the villain. A defining step of the journey is "Atonement with the Father". Obi-Wan's loss of a father figure could have impacted his relationship with Anakin, whom both Obi-Wan and Palpatine are fatherlike mentors to. Luke's discovery that Vader is his father has strong repercussions on the saga and is regarded as one of the most influential plot twists in cinema. Supreme Leader Snoke encourages Kylo Ren to kill his father, Han Solo. Kylo uses the fact that Rey is an orphan to tempt her into joining the dark side. According to Inverse, the final scene in The Last Jedi, which depicts servant children playing with a toy of Luke and one boy using the Force, symbolizes that "the Force can be found in people with humble beginnings."

Historical influences 
Political science has been an important element of Star Wars since the franchise launched in 1977, focusing on a struggle between democracy and dictatorship. Battles featuring the Ewoks and Gungans against the Empire and Trade Federation, respectively, represent the clash between a primitive society and a more advanced one, similar to the Vietnam-American War. Darth Vader's design was initially inspired by Samurai armor, and also incorporated a German military helmet. Originally, Lucas conceived of the Sith as a group that served the Emperor in the same way that the Schutzstaffel served Adolf Hitler; this was condensed into one character in the form of Vader. Stormtroopers borrow the name of World War I German "shock" troopers. Imperial officers wear uniforms resembling those of German forces during World War II, and political and security officers resemble the black-clad SS down to the stylized silver death's head on their caps. World War II terms were used for names in the films; e.g. the planets Kessel (a term that refers to a group of encircled forces) and Hoth (after a German general who served on the snow-laden Eastern Front). Shots of the commanders looking through AT-AT walker viewscreens in The Empire Strikes Back resemble tank interiors, and space battles in the original film were based on World War I and World War II dogfights.

Palpatine being a chancellor before becoming the Emperor in the prequel trilogy alludes to Hitler's role before appointing himself Führer. Lucas has also drawn parallels to historical dictators such as Julius Caesar, Napoleon Bonaparte, and politicians like Richard Nixon. The Great Jedi Purge mirrors the events of the Night of the Long Knives. The corruption of the Galactic Republic is modeled after the fall of the democratic Roman Republic and the formation of an empire.

On the inspiration for the First Order formed "from the ashes of the Empire", The Force Awakens director J. J. Abrams spoke of conversations the writers had about how the Nazis could have escaped to Argentina after WWII and "started working together again."

Cultural impact 

The Star Wars saga has had a significant impact on popular culture, with references to its fictional universe deeply embedded in everyday life. Phrases like "evil empire" and "May the Force be with you" have become part of the popular lexicon. The first Star Wars film in 1977 was a cultural unifier, enjoyed by a wide spectrum of people. The film can be said to have helped launch the science-fiction boom of the late 1970s and early 1980s, making science-fiction films a mainstream genre. The widespread impact made it a prime target for parody works and homages, with popular examples including Hardware Wars, Spaceballs, The Family Guy Trilogy and Robot Chicken: Star Wars.

In 1989, the Library of Congress selected the original Star Wars film for preservation in the U.S. National Film Registry, as being "culturally, historically, or aesthetically significant." The Empire Strikes Back was selected in 2010, and Return of the Jedi was selected in 2021. 35 mm reels of the 1997 Special Editions were the versions initially presented for preservation because of the difficulty of transferring from the original prints, but it was later revealed that the Library possesses a copyright deposit print of the original theatrical releases.

Industry 
The original Star Wars film was a huge success for 20th Century Fox, and was credited for reinvigorating the company. Within three weeks of the film's release, the studio's stock price doubled to a record high. Prior to 1977, 20th Century Fox's greatest annual profits were $37 million, while in 1977, the company broke that record by posting a profit of $79 million. The franchise helped Fox to change from an almost bankrupt production company to a thriving media conglomerate.

Star Wars fundamentally changed the aesthetics and narratives of Hollywood films, switching the focus of Hollywood-made films from deep, meaningful stories based on dramatic conflict, themes and irony to sprawling special-effects-laden blockbusters, as well as changing the Hollywood film industry in fundamental ways. Before Star Wars, special effects in films had not appreciably advanced since the 1950s. The commercial success of Star Wars created a boom in state-of-the-art special effects in the late 1970s. Along with Jaws, Star Wars started the tradition of the summer blockbuster film in the entertainment industry, where films open on many screens at the same time and profitable franchises are important. It created the model for the major film trilogy and showed that merchandising rights on a film could generate more money than the film itself did.

Film critic Roger Ebert wrote in his book The Great Movies, "Like The Birth of a Nation and Citizen Kane, Star Wars was a technical watershed that influenced many of the movies that came after." It began a new generation of special effects and high-energy motion pictures. The film was one of the first films to link genres together to invent a new, high-concept genre for filmmakers to build upon. Finally, along with Steven Spielberg's Jaws, it shifted the film industry's focus away from personal filmmaking of the 1970s and towards fast-paced, big-budget blockbusters for younger audiences.

Some critics have blamed Star Wars and Jaws for "ruining" Hollywood by shifting its focus from "sophisticated" films such as The Godfather, Taxi Driver, and Annie Hall to films about spectacle and juvenile fantasy, and for the industry shift from stand-alone, one and done films, towards blockbuster franchises with multiple sequels and prequels. One such critic, Peter Biskind, complained, "When all was said and done, Lucas and Spielberg returned the 1970s audience, grown sophisticated on a diet of European and New Hollywood films, to the simplicities of the pre-1960s Golden Age of movies... They marched backward through the looking-glass." In an opposing view, Tom Shone wrote that through Star Wars and Jaws, Lucas and Spielberg "didn't betray cinema at all: they plugged it back into the grid, returning the medium to its roots as a carnival sideshow, a magic act, one big special effect", which was "a kind of rebirth".

The original Star Wars trilogy is widely considered one of the best film trilogies in history. Numerous filmmakers have been influenced by Star Wars, including Damon Lindelof, Dean Devlin, Roland Emmerich, John Lasseter, David Fincher, Joss Whedon, John Singleton, Kevin Smith, and later Star Wars directors J. J. Abrams and Gareth Edwards. Lucas's concept of a "used universe" particularly influenced Ridley Scott's Blade Runner (1982) and Alien (1979), James Cameron's Aliens (1986) as well as The Terminator (1984), George Miller's Mad Max 2 (1981), and Peter Jackson's The Lord of the Rings trilogy (2001–2003). Christopher Nolan cited Star Wars as an influence when making the 2010 blockbuster film Inception.

Fan works 

The Star Wars saga has inspired many fans to create their own non-canon material set in the Star Wars galaxy. In recent years, this has ranged from writing fan fiction to creating fan films. In 2002, Lucasfilm sponsored the first annual Official Star Wars Fan Film Awards, officially recognizing filmmakers and the genre. Because of concerns over potential copyright and trademark issues, however, the contest was initially open only to parodies, mockumentaries, and documentaries. Fan fiction films set in the Star Wars universe were originally ineligible, but in 2007, Lucasfilm changed the submission standards to allow in-universe fiction entries. Lucasfilm has allowed but not endorsed the creation of fan fiction, as long as it does not attempt to make a profit.

Academia 
As the characters and the storyline of the original trilogy are so well known, educators have used the films in the classroom as a learning resource.  For example, a project in Western Australia honed elementary school students storytelling skills by role-playing action scenes from the movies and later creating props and audio/visual scenery to enhance their performance.  Others have used the films to encourage second-level students to integrate technology in the science classroom by making prototype lightsabers. Similarly, psychiatrists in New Zealand and the US have advocated their use in the university classroom to explain different types of psychopathology.

See also 

 501st Legion
 Architecture of Star Wars
 Comparison of Star Trek and Star Wars
 Jedi census phenomenon
 Jediism
 List of space science fiction franchises
 List of Star Wars characters
 List of Star Wars creatures
 List of Star Wars planets and moons
 Music of Star Wars
 Physics and Star Wars
 Star Wars Celebration
 Star Wars Day
 Star Wars documentaries
 Star Wars: The High Republic
The Force
 The Story of Star Wars
 Technology in Star Wars
 Wookieepedia, the Star Wars Wiki

Notes

References

Works cited

Further reading

External links 

 
 
 Star Wars Map – 2020 official; HiRez; WebSite

 
Action film franchises
Action film series
Adventure film series
American science fantasy films
American epic films
Fantasy film franchises
Films about telekinesis
Film series introduced in 1977
Politics in fiction
Fiction about space warfare
Lucasfilm franchises
Mass media franchises introduced in 1977
Military fiction
Mythopoeia
Religion in science fiction
Science fantasy
Science fiction
Science fiction film franchises
Soft science fiction
Space opera
Topps franchises